Indian school may refer to:

 American Indian boarding schools, boarding schools established in the United States during the late 19th century to educate Native American youths according to Euro-American standards
 Canadian Indian residential school system, a system in Canada similar to the Indian school system in the U.S. during the 19th and 20th centuries
 Indian School, Al-Ghubra, an international school in Al-Ghubra, Oman
 Indian School, Al Wadi Al Kabir, an international school in Oman
 Indian School, Bahrain, one of the largest expatriate schools in the Persian Gulf region
 Indian School, Darsait, an international school in Darsait, Oman
 Indian School, Muscat, an international school in Muscat, Oman
 Indian School, Ras al-Khaimah, an international school in the United Arab Emirates
 Indian School, Salalah, an Indian-run, self-financing, co-educational institution
 Indian School, Sohar, a school managed by Indian embassy in Oman
 Indian School (TV series), a BBC documentary series set in Pune, India

See also
 Schools in India